Christer or Krister are varieties of the masculine given name Kristian, derived from the Latin name Christianus, which in turn comes from the Greek word khristianós, which means "follower of Christ".

The name, written in its two variants Christer and Krister, is quite common in the Nordic countries.

Notable people with the name include:

Catherine Christer Hennix (born 1948), Swedish-American composer, philosopher, scientist and visual artist associated with drone minimal music
Christer Abris (formerly Abrahamsson, born 1947), Swedish former ice hockey goaltender
Christer Adelsbo, born 1962, is a Swedish social democratic politician who has been a member of the Riksdag since 2002
Christer Basma (born 1972), Norwegian football coach and defender
Christer Björkman (born 1957), Swedish singer
Christer Boucht (1911–2009), Finnish-Swedish lawyer, adventure traveller and writer
Christer Boustedt (1939–1986), Swedish musician and actor
Christer Dahl (born 1940), Swedish director, script writer and producer
Christer Ellefsen (born 1978), Norwegian football defender
Christer Engelhardt, born 1969, is a Swedish social democratic politician who has been a member of the Riksdag since 2002
Christer Erséus (born 1951), Swedish zoologist
Christer Flodin (born 1948), Swedish television actor, best known for his appearances in crime drama series
Christer Fuglesang (born 1957), Swedish physicist and an ESA astronaut
Christer Fursth (born 1970), Swedish football midfielder
Christer Gardell (born 1960), Swedish venture capitalist
Christer George (born 1979), Norwegian football player
Christer Holloman, the Chairman of First Tuesday UK and professional business speaker
Christer Johansson (poker player), Swedish professional sports better and poker player based in Malmö
Christer Johansson (skier), Swedish former cross country skier who competed in the 1970s
Christer Kellgren (born 1958), retired Swedish professional ice hockey player
Christer Kierkegaard (1918–1999), Swedish Navy rear admiral
Christer Kleiven (born 1988), Norwegian midfielder who currently plays for Start
Christer Löfqvist (1944–1978), former international speedway rider
Christer Lindarw (born 1953), Swedish clothes designer, drag queen artist, leader of dragshow group After Dark
Christer Magnusson (born 1958), Swedish former handball player
Christer Majbäck (born 1964), Swedish former cross country skier
Christer Nylander (born 1968), Swedish Liberal People's Party politician, member of the Riksdag since 2002
Christer Olsson (born 1970), retired professional hockey player
Christer Pettersson (1947–2004), Swedish criminal, suspect in the 1986 assassination of Olof Palme, Prime Minister of Sweden
Christer Sjögren (born 1950), Swedish dansband and rock singer
Christer Skoog (born 1945), Swedish politician
Christer Sturmark (born 1964), Swedish author, IT-entrepreneur and prominent debater on religion and humanism in Swedish media
Christer Wallin (born 1969), former freestyle swimmer from Sweden
Christer Warren (born 1974), English football player
Christer Winbäck (born 1953), Swedish Liberal People's Party politician, member of the Riksdag since 2002
Christer Youssef (born 1987), Swedish professional footballer Attacking midfielder
Christer Zetterberg (1941–2012), Swedish businessman, Chairman of investment bank Carnegie
Lars-Christer Olsson, former UEFA Chief Executive from 2003
Tom-Christer Nilsen (born 1969), Norwegian politician for the Conservative Party and current deputy county mayor of Hordaland

See also 
 Krister, Swedish variant of Christer

Norwegian masculine given names
Swedish masculine given names